Drigar Thubten Dargye Ling, is a Buddhist center in Singapore. The foundation was originally set up by Guru Garchen Rinpoche. The present premises are located at Geylang, Singapore.

Overview
Drigar Thubten Dargye Ling was founded in 2007 by Garchen Rinpoche. The original name was Dri Thubten Dargye Ling.

See also
Buddhism in Singapore

References

External links

Buddhist temples in Singapore
Geylang